The Case Swedish Open 2015 is the Swedish Open for 2015, which is a tournament of the PSA World Tour event International (prize money: $70,000). The event took place in Linköping in Sweden from 5 February to 8 February. Nick Matthew won his fifth Swedish Open trophy, beating Grégory Gaultier in the final.

Prize money and ranking points
For 2015, the prize purse was $70,000. The prize money and points breakdown is as follows:

Seeds

Draw and results

See also
2015 PSA World Tour
Swedish Open (squash)

References

External links
PSA Case Swedish Open 2015 website
Case Swedish Open official website
Case Swedish Open SquashSite website

Squash tournaments in Sweden
Swedish Open Squash
2015 in Swedish sport